The Protectorate General to Pacify the North or Grand Protectorate General to Pacify the North (647–784) was a Chinese military government established by the Tang dynasty in 647 to pacify the former territory of Xueyantuo, which extended from Lake Baikal to the north, the Gobi Desert to the south, the Khingan Mountains to the east, and the Altay Mountains to the west. It controlled the Mongolian Plateau from 647 to 682.

It was first established as Yanran at Shanyu Tai, southwest of present-day Urat Middle Banner, the northern slope of Lang Shan. This was later shifted to Hanhai, around the bank of the Orkhon River, and named from its namesakes for a short period before it was changed to Anbei. The seat of governance remained there until the year 687.

History

In 646 the Tang dynasty conquered the Xuyantuo and on 9 January 647, thirteen Tiele and Uyghur tribes surrendered to the Tang. Tang Taizong organized them into six commanderies and seven tributary prefectures under the Jimi system. The six commanderies were Hanhai (翰海府), Jinwei (金微府), Yanran (燕然府), Youling (幽陵府), Guilin (龜林府), and Lushan (盧山府). The seven prefectures were Gaolan (皐蘭州), Gaoque (高闕州), Jilu (雞鹿州), Jitian (雞田州), Yuxi (榆溪州), Dailin (蹛林州), and Douyan (竇顏州). Collectively these were known as the "Cantian Khan Circuit." On 10 April the Yanran Protectorate was created at the foothills of the Shanyu Plateau, southwest of present-day Urad Middle Banner, and governorship of the 13 tribes was handed over to the protector general, Li Suli (李素立), who served from 647 to 649.

On 5 February 663 the Yanran Protectorate was renamed Hanhai Protectorate.

In August 669 the Hanhai Protectorate was renamed the Protectorate General to Pacify the North, otherwise known as the Anbei Duhufu. Its seat was relocated to the city of Datong in present-day Ejin Banner.

In 687 the seat of Anbei was moved to the city of Xi'an near modern Minle County due to incursions by the Second Turkic Khaganate.

In 698 the seat was moved to Yunzhong near modern Horinger.

In 708 the seat of Anbei was moved to the western Shouxiang city near modern Wuyuan County, Inner Mongolia.

In 714 the Anbei and Chanyu protectorates were separated. Chanyu was re-located to Yunzhong while Anbei was re-located to the middle Shouxiang city, near modern Baotou.

In 749 the seat was moved to the military settlement of Hengsai, near modern-day Urad Middle Banner.

Due to unfavorable farming conditions near the Hengsai settlement, Guo Ziyi resettled the army near modern Urad Front Banner in 755.

Following the An Lushan Rebellion, the Chanyu and Anbei protectorates lost any real authority and survived in name only. Due to the taboo of An Lushan's name, the Anbei Protectorate was renamed the Zhenbei Protectorate in 757, which meant "Protectorate General to Suppress the North."

In 758 the Hengsai Army changed its name to Tiande Army and came under control of the Zhenwu Jiedushi.

In 840 a group of Uyghurs attacked the Tiande Army.

In 843 the Chanyu Protectorate was renamed back to Anbei Protectorate

List of protector generals

 Li Suli (李素立) 647-649
 Jiang Jian (姜簡)
 Ren Yaxiang (任雅相)
 Liu Shenli (劉審禮) 661
 Jiang Xie (姜協)
 Zang Shan'an (臧善安)
 Pang Tongfu (龐同福)
 Li Dazhi (李大志) after 672
 Sun Jun (孫俊) 694
 Li Dan (李旦), otherwise known as Emperor Ruizong of Tang, 699-702
 Zang Huailiang (臧懷亮)
 Wang Jun (王晙) before 714
 Li Sizhi (李嗣直) 
 Zhang Zhiyun (張知運) around 716
 Zang Huaike (臧懷恪)
 Zang Xizhuang (臧希莊) 729
 Tian Wan (田琬)
 Li Guangbi (李光弼) 745-746
 Li Wan (李琬) 749
 Guo Ziyi (郭子儀) 749-754
 Li Linfu (李林甫) 
 Zang Fangzhi (臧方直)
 Pugu Huai'en (僕固懷恩) 762

Jiedushi

 Li Zhongshun (李忠順) 843-845
 Qi Bitong (契苾通) 852-854
 Gao Chenggong (高承恭) 861-863
 Shi Shanyou (石善友) 893-903
 Li Cunjin (李存進) 923

See also
 Protectorate General to Pacify the East
 Protectorate General to Pacify the West
 Protectorate General to Pacify the South
 History of Mongolia
 Chinese military history
 Horses in East Asian warfare
 Tang dynasty in Inner Asia
 Epitaph of Pugu Yitu
 Administrative divisions of the Tang dynasty

References

Citations

Sources 

 .
 
 
  (alk. paper)
 
 
 
  (paperback).
 
 
 
 .

Further reading

 Ai, Chong. Tangdai Anbei Duhufu Qianxi Kaolun (A Study on the Change of Seats of the Anbei Protectorate During the Tang Dynasty). Journal of Shaanxi Normal University. 2001.4. ISSN 1000-5293.
 Li, Dalong. Youguan Tang Anbei Duhufu De Jige Wenti (On the Several Questions of the Tang Dynasty's Anbei Protectorate). Northern Cultural Relics. 2004.2. ISSN 1001-0483
 Wang, Jilin, "Anbei Duhufu" ("Protectorate General to Pacify the North"). Chinese Encyclopedia (Historiography Edition), 1st ed.
 Zhou, Weiyan, "Duhufu" ("Protectorate"). Encyclopedia of China (Chinese History Edition), 1st ed
 Xue, Zongzheng (1992). A History of Turks. Beijing: Chinese Social Sciences Press. . p. 404-429.
 Pulleyblank, Edwin G (2002). Central Asia and Non-Chinese Peoples of Ancient China. Aldershot: Ashgate Publishing. . II, p. 35-42.

Military history of the Tang dynasty
Administrative divisions of the Tang dynasty
History of Mongolia
Chinese Central Asia